B.S. College, also known as Baldeo Sahu Mahavidyalaya, established in 1962, is one of the oldest general degree college in Lohardaga, Jharkhand. It offers undergraduate courses in arts, commerce and sciences. It is affiliated to  Ranchi University.

Accreditation
B.S. College was accredited by the National Assessment and Accreditation Council (NAAC).

See also
Education in India
Ranchi University
Lohardaga
Literacy in India
List of institutions of higher education in Jharkhand

References

External links
http://www.bscollegelohardaga.org/

Colleges affiliated to Ranchi University
Educational institutions established in 1962
Universities and colleges in Jharkhand
1962 establishments in Bihar